Faza'il-e-A'maal (Virtues of deeds), originally titled Tablighi Nisab (Curriculum for Tabligh), is a religious text composed mainly of treatises by the Indian Deobandi scholar Muhammad Zakariya Kandhlawi for the transnational Islamic missionary movement, Tablighi Jamaat. The book was written originally in simple Urdu although it has been translated into many languages and is a collection of pious and edifying tales based mostly on inspirational hadith traditions and anecdotes. Tablighi Jamaat promote the book to the non-Arab communities, while to Arabic speaking communities they suggest reading Riyad as-Salihin by Yahya Nawawi instead.

History 
In about 1955 a collection of works by Muhammad Zakariya was published in two volumes under the title Tablighi Nisab. A single volume version was published in 1958.

The first English translation was published in 1960. A revised English edition was published by Kutub Khana Faydi in Lahore in 1980.  Another English translation of the book was published in 1984 by Waterval Islamic Institute, Johannesburg and later become immensely popular in South Africa. In 1985, the translations from the second edition were published in Delhi as Teachings of Islam. The English edition published in Delhi in 1986 contained both parts one and two; part two was omitted from later versions. Kutub Khana Faydi published the third revised English edition of the book in 1985 as Faza`il A`maal.  The 1987 Karachi edition was a reprint of the third edition, and was reprinted in England and South Africa. A simple English edition was published in 1995.

The 1985 Kutub Khana Faydi edition has been published in French translation. The English and French translations retain the madrasa idioms, and the Uttar Pradesh town background and world-view of the original Urdu books. A Turkish version has also been published titled Ammelerin Faziletleri.

A tahqiq-takhreez added bengali translated version has been announced to be published on 19 January 2022 by Darul Fikr Publications of Bangladesh.

Overview 
Some new Urdu editions also add:
Muslim Degeneration and its Only Remedy (1939) by Ihtishamul Hasan Kandhlawi.
English editions include writings such as:
Six Fundamentals (translation of Ashiq Ilahi Bulandshahri's Chhe Baten ([Six points])), 
A Call to Muslims (translation of a 1944 speech by Muhammad Ilyas Kandhlawi), and
Muslim Degeneration and its Only Remedy (1939) (translation of Ihtishamul Hasan Kandhlawi's Musalmānoṉ kī maujūdah pastī kā wāḥid ‘ilāj). 
Some editions of Faza'il-e-A'mal do not contain:
Zakariya's Virtues of durood (1965) This was omitted because some Deobandi scholars in Pakistan were against its inclusion.

Contents 
The book has two parts (or volumes):

In the preface of the book is mentioned that Muhammad Zakariyya Kandhlawi wrote, "Hikayat-e-Sahaba" (Stories Of The Sahaba) at the request of Abdul Qadir Raipuri, "Fazail-e-Quran" (Virtues of Quran) at the request of Muhammad Yasin Niginwi, "Fazail-e-Namaz", "Fazail-e-Zikr", "Fazail-e-Tableegh" and "Fazail-e-Ramadan" at the request of his uncle Muhammad Ilyas Kandhlawi. "Fazail-e-Sadaqat" and "Fazail-e-Hajj" was written at the request of Muhammad Yusuf Kandhlawi.

Part one
Stories of sahabah. This consists of stories of Mohammad's companions, depicting them as role models for Muslims. (272 pages)
Virtues of the holy qur'aan. Forty hadith on the merits of the Quran. (120 pages)
Virtues of salaat. Hadith on the merits of prayer. (112 pages)
Virtues of zikr. Quranic verses and hadith on the merits of phrases known as kalima that are used to remember God. (265 pages)
Virtues of tabligh. The significance of preaching the faith. (48 pages)
Virtues of ramadan. The merits and significance of ramadan, the month of fasting. (80 pages)
Muslim Degeneration and its Only Remedy.  The history and causes of Muslim degeneration and how preaching the faith will solve this problem. (48 pages)
Six Fundamentals (}
Virtues of durood
Part two
Virtues of charity (Fazail-e-Sadqaat)
Virtues of hajj (Fazail-e-Hajj)

Virtues of charity 
The Fazail-e-Sadqaat (Urdu: فضائلِ ﺻﺪﻗﺎﺕ) is the second volume of the Fazail-e-Amaal series, a compilation of selected chapters from various books, also written by Muhammad Zakariya Kandhlawi.

The text consists of selected verses of the Qur'an, Hadiths, commentary thereon, and other material. The book is a compilation of different previous books written by the same author. It has been translated into English, Arabic, Persian, Bengali, and many other languages. Initially, it was popular in Pakistan, India, Bangladesh and among South Asian immigrants in the United States or UK but now the popularity is exponentially grown up in recent years all over Europe, the Asia Pacific, African and Latin American countries. It is also used by the Tablighi Jamaat for  taalim (teaching) purposes.

Criticism 
The book has been claimed to be based mostly on historically suspect and non-authentic hadith traditions and anecdotes.

Hammood at-Tuwaijri wrote that the Tablighi Jamaat "pay a great deal of attention to this book, which they respect as Ahl as-Sunnah respect as-Saheehayn and other books of hadeeth. The Tableeghis have made this book the most important reference work for the Indians and other non-Arabs who follow them. It contains a great deal of matters of shirk, innovation (bid'ah), myths, and fabricated (mawdoo‘) and weak (da‘eef) hadeeths. In fact it is a book of evil, misguidance and confusion (fitnah)."

The Maturidi, Shams ad-Deen al-Afghaani wrote, "The leading imams of the Deobandis have books which are venerated by the Deobandis, but they are filled with the myths of grave-worshippers and Sufi idolatry, such as – and he mentioned several books, including Tableeghi Nisaab, i.e., Nisaab at-Tableegh, and Manhaj at-Tableegh. These Deobandis did not openly disavow these books or warn against them, and they did not put a stop to the printing and sale of these books. The markets of India and Pakistan and elsewhere are full of them."

The book is widely criticized in Saudi Arabia, and Tabligh Jamaat is officially banned there, and for that reason, the book is also officially banned there.

Gallery

See also 
Deobandi hadith studies

References

External links 
 Faza'il-e-A'maal in English
 Faza'il-e-A'maal in Arabic

Maturidi literature
Sunni literature
Sufi literature
Deobandi hadith literature
20th-century Indian books
Censored books
Books by Muhammad Zakariyya al-Kandhlawi